Kildare railway station is a railway station on the Dublin to Cork Railway line and Dublin commuter service.

It is also the changing-point for passengers  to/from services to Waterford.

It has three tracks, one for through services and two platforms. As the first major station on the south- and west-bound line from Heuston station, it is served, or at least passed-through, by a large number of trains.  It is also used by timber trains and container trains travelling between Waterford and County Mayo to run round.

History
The station opened on 4 August 1846 and was closed for goods traffic on 6 September 1976.

Bus links
Passengers can also connect at the station to a shuttle bus service to Kildare Village shopping outlet. On days of racing there is a shuttle bus to Curragh Racecourse. South Kildare Community Transport also serve the station providing links to Milltown, Nurney and Kildangan.

See also
 List of railway stations in Ireland

References

External links

Kildare Station website

Iarnród Éireann stations in County Kildare
Railway stations opened in 1846
Kildare (town)
1846 establishments in Ireland
Railway stations in the Republic of Ireland opened in 1846